Buena Vista Home Entertainment, Inc., doing business as Walt Disney Studios Home Entertainment, is the home entertainment distribution arm of The Walt Disney Company. The division handles the distribution of Disney's films, television series, and other audiovisual content across several home media formats, such as Ultra HD Blu-ray, Blu-ray discs, DVDs, and digital media, under various brand labels around the world.

The division was legally incorporated as Buena Vista Home Video on February 13, 1987. It was renamed to its current legal name in 1997. The division adopted the current Walt Disney Studios-branding in its public name in 2007, but retained the Buena Vista-branding within its legal corporate name.

History

Background 
Before Disney began releasing home video titles itself, it licensed some titles to MCA's DiscoVision label for their newly developed disc format, later called LaserDisc. Disney's agreement with MCA ended in December 1981.

In 1980, Disney established its own video distribution operation as part of Walt Disney Telecommunications and Non-Theatrical Company (WDTNT) with Jim Jimirro as its first president. Home video was not considered to be a major market by Disney at the time. WDTNT Co. also handled marketing of other miscellaneous ancillary items such as short 8 mm films for home movies.

Disney's first releases on videotape were 13 titles that were licensed for rental to Fotomat on March 4, 1980, initially in a four-city test (Chicago, Houston, Philadelphia, and San Francisco/Oakland/San Jose), to be expanded nationwide by the end of 1980. The agreement specified rental fees ranging from $7.95 to $13.95.

Disney was unusual among the major studios in offering a program for authorized rentals. Most of the other studios involved in the videocassette market at the time were trying to find ways to stop dealers from renting out their movie tapes. Magnetic Video (with titles from 20th Century Fox and others) ceased doing business with Fotomat after Fotomat began renting Magnetic Video cassettes without authorization.

In the late 1980s, Disney began seeking other outlets to distribute its video, and signed deals with mass-merchant retailers such as Target, Caldor, and Walmart. Around this time, the studio began partnering with major retailers for advertising campaigns.

Buena Vista Home Video 
Buena Vista Home Video was legally incorporated on February 13, 1987. The "Buena Vista" name was adopted from Buena Vista Pictures Distribution, who also acted as copyright holder for video tapes released directly under the BVHE banner. The name Buena Vista Home Video originated as a label of WDTNT in 1984, originally used to distribute tapes of Hopalong Cassidy. Soon, BVHV became the label utilized for a variety of miscellaneous content; such content included animation not created by Disney (such as Rocky and Bullwinkle and Alvin and the Chipmunks), concerts and other adult music titles, and various special-interest programs, including The Very Best of The Ed Sullivan Show. 

In November 1992, Buena Vista Home Video entered into a worldwide joint venture with Jim Henson Productions to form Jim Henson Video, which distributed Henson-owned material, including various Muppet productions; the company had previously distributed Muppet content in the United States from 1983 to 1985 under the Muppet Home Video label. This lasted until late 1997. The following year, the label moved to Sony Pictures' Columbia TriStar Home Video division.

In July 1993, Buena Vista Home Video signed a multimillion-dollar multiyear North American licensing deal with DIC Entertainment. The deal included over 1,000 half-hours worth of animated content from DIC, alongside the creation of a dedicated home video label and interactive and multimedia opportunities. This deal lasted until 2000, following DIC's sale by Disney, with DIC later signing a deal with Lions Gate Home Entertainment in May the following year.

In April 1996, due to ongoing realignment stemming from Disney's merger with Capital Cities/ABC, Buena Vista Home Video was transferred out of the Disney Television and Telecommunications group to The Walt Disney Studios. In August 1996, Disney and Tokuma Shoten Publishing entered a deal wherein Buena Vista Home Video would acquire the worldwide home media distribution rights to the Studio Ghibli animated films. Disney would go on to produce the English dubs and distribute 15 of Ghibli's films, through the Walt Disney Pictures, Buena Vista Home Video, Miramax and Touchstone Pictures banners. Buena Vista Home Video was renamed Buena Vista Home Entertainment in 1997.

In July 1998, Buena Vista Home Entertainment entered into a distribution agreement with Warner Home Video where the latter would distribute over 100 Buena Vista/Disney titles on DVD in EMEA and ex-Soviet Union regions until the end of 2000. The distribution of VHS releases, however, remain under Disney's full control.

In 2005, Roger Corman-owned production company New Concorde signed a distribution deal with Buena Vista Home Entertainment, giving BVHE home video distribution rights to 400 Corman-produced films, including the pre-1984 New World Pictures library until 2008.

Walt Disney Studios Home Entertainment 
As part of a broader company-wide effort, Buena Vista Home Entertainment dropped the "Buena Vista" branding in 2007 and was renamed as Walt Disney Studios Home Entertainment. However, the division retained Buena Vista as its legal corporate name. In July 2017, GKIDS and Shout! Factory acquired the North America home video rights of the Studio Ghibli films from Disney. However, Disney still handles home video distribution of the company's films in Japan and China. In March 2019, Disney acquired 21st Century Fox, and after 20th Century Fox was renamed to 20th Century Studios in January 2020, 20th Century Home Entertainment was folded into Walt Disney Studios Home Entertainment a few months later that year.

Distribution 
The company currently distributes digital media, Blu-ray discs and DVDs under many labels around the world.

Moratorium practices 
Disney is notable for implementing a longtime moratorium practice on its film library, known in the industry as the "Disney Vault". Disney has stated that this practice of moratorium is done to both control their market and to allow the studio's films to be reissued for subsequent generations of viewers. This practice was extended to the 20th Century Fox library, after its acquisition by Disney in 2019.

Animated features 

The first Disney animated feature to be released on videocassette was Dumbo on June 28, 1981, for rental only. The Many Adventures of Winnie the Pooh was released for rental and sale at the same time. Alice in Wonderland was released on October 15, 1981, for rental only. Fun and Fancy Free was released in 1982 as 'Fun and Fancy Free' Featuring: Mickey and the Beanstalk, to capitalize on the best-known segment of the film.

Walt Disney Home Video 
Their agreement with DiscoVision having ended in 1981, Disney began releasing LaserDiscs under the Walt Disney Home Video label to their own network of distributors and dealers. The first five titles were shipped in June 1982: The Black Hole, The Love Bug, Escape to Witch Mountain, The Many Adventures of Winnie the Pooh, and Mickey Mouse and Donald Duck Cartoons, Collection One. Five more titles shipped in July: Pete's Dragon, Dumbo, Davy Crockett and the River Pirates, The One and Only, Genuine, Original Family Band, and Mickey Mouse and Donald Duck Cartoons, Collection Two.

Disney released more cartoon compilations (pre-Walt Disney Cartoon Classics in 1983) in late 1981, including Goofy Over Sports and A Tale of Two Critters.

Dumbo was released for sale on tape in summer 1982, while Alice in Wonderland was released for sale in November 1982. The next major animated feature to be released (excluding the "package" anthology features) was Robin Hood on December 3, 1984, starting the Walt Disney Classics collection. By 1982, all the video releases were for sale and rental, along with newer releases, but at high prices.

July 16, 1985 saw the home video premiere of Pinocchio which became the bestselling video of that year. Later, the Making Your Dreams Come True promotion started on November 6, 1985 with repackaged live action titles. In addition, Dumbo was released on the same day.

Disney DVD 

Disney DVD is the brand name under which Buena Vista Home Entertainment releases its Disney-branded motion pictures. Disney began working on title releases for DVDs in 1997, although they were not released in this format in the UK until early 1998. Disney's first U.S. DVD release was Mary Poppins on March 1, 1998. VHS releases ceased with Bambi II, which was released on February 7, 2006.

Disney Blu-ray 

Disney Blu-ray is the brand name under which Buena Vista Home Entertainment releases its Disney-branded motion pictures in high-definition. In late 2006, Disney began releasing titles, like the Pirates of the Caribbean films, the National Treasure films, and the first two Narnia films on Blu-ray.

In late 2010, Walt Disney Studios Home Entertainment began releasing their 3D movies in the Blu-ray 3D format, starting with A Christmas Carol and Alice in Wonderland. In 2017, Walt Disney Studios Home Entertainment quietly discontinued releasing new titles in the format in North America, presumably due to the declining interest in the 3D format at home in the region. Despite this, Walt Disney Studios Home Entertainment has continued releasing new titles in the format in other regions.

Disney Second Screen 

A new feature that was included in the Diamond Edition of Bambi on March 1, 2011, "Disney Second Screen" is a feature accessible via a computer or iPad app download that provides additional content as the user views the film. Disney Second Screen syncs along with the movie, and as the film plays, interactive elements such as trivia, photo galleries, and animated flipbooks appear on the iPad or computer screen. The service was discontinued since October 2, 2016.

Ultra HD Blu-ray 
Disney began releasing their new films on Ultra HD Blu-ray starting with Guardians of the Galaxy Vol. 2 on August 22, 2017. Christopher Nolan's The Prestige was Disney's first catalog release on UHD, under the Touchstone label on December 19, 2017.

See also 
 List of Disney theatrical animated feature films
 List of Disney feature-length home entertainment releases
 Lists of Walt Disney Studios films
 Walt Disney Pictures
 List of Disney live-action adaptations and remakes of Disney animated films

References

External links 
 

Companies based in Burbank, California
Home video companies of the United States
Walt Disney Studios (division)
The Walt Disney Company subsidiaries
Home video distributors
Home video companies established in 1987
Mass media companies established in 1987
1987 establishments in California
Disney Media Networks